The Zhaishan Tunnel is a tunnel in Jincheng Township, Kinmen County, Taiwan.

History
Construction of the tunnel started in 1961 and was completed on 22 March 1966, a few years after the Second Taiwan Strait Crisis in 1958 between the Republic of China Armed Forces and People's Liberation Army. Due to the lack of manpower and money to preserve the tunnel, it was closed and abandoned in 1986. Later on, there was a growing interest in preserving the national heritage and remembering those who fought for Kinmen, thus on 23 May 1997, the Kinmen National Park took over the management of the tunnel. The tunnel was opened to the public in 1998.

Structures
There are seven rooms inside that serve as barracks. The tunnel features an A-shaped waterway with 357 meters in length, 11.5 meters in width and 8 meters in height. It was used to conceal small naval vessels.

Activities
The tunnel has been the venue for the Kinmen Tunnel Music Festival since 2019.

See also
 List of tourist attractions in Taiwan

References

1966 establishments in Taiwan
Jincheng Township
Military history of Taiwan
Tunnels completed in 1966
Tunnels in Kinmen County
Tunnel warfare